The Spice of Life is the second album by Marlena Shaw. It was her last studio album with Cadet Records and contains her famous version of the Ashford & Simpson song "California Soul".

Track listing
 "Woman of the Ghetto" (Bobby Miller, Marlena Shaw,  Richard Evans) 6:02 
 "Call it Stormy Monday" (T-Bone Walker) 3:01
 "Where Can I Go?" (Leo Fuld, Sigment Berland, Sonny Miller) 2:21 
 "I'm Satisfied" (Morris Dollison) 2:48
 "I Wish I Knew (How It Would Feel To Be Free)" (Billy Taylor, Dick Dallas) 3:12 
 "Liberation Conversation" (Bobby Miller, Marlena Shaw) 2:03
 "California Soul" (Nickolas Ashford, Valerie Simpson) 2:59
 "Go Away Little Boy" (Gerry Goffin, Carole King) 2:45
 "Looking Through the Eyes of Love" (Barry Mann, Cynthia Weil) 3:00 
 "Anyone Can Move a Mountain" (Johnny Marks) 3:03 
(Note: times are taken from the original album sleeve.)

Bonus tracks on Chess Legendary Master Series (2CD set with Out of Different Bags, also with bonus tracks)

11. "Mercy, Mercy, Mercy"
12. "Waiting for Charlie to Come Home"
13. "The House that Jack Built"
14. "Brother, Where are You?"
15. "We Could Have Been Fine"

Technical Personnel
 Arranged & Produced by: Richard Evans & Charles Stepney
 Recordings Engineers: Stu Black & Dave Purple
 Album supervision: Bobby Miller
 Cover photo: Bob Crawford
 Album design: Jerry Griffith

Additional AllMusic Credits

 Nick Ashford - Composer
 Ken Druker - Executive Producer 
 Gerry Goffin - Composer
 Bob Irwin - Reissue Mastering
 Carole King - Composer
 Hollis King - Reissue Art Director 
 Bryan Koniarz -  Reissue Producer 
 Johnny Marks - Composer 
 Loonis McGlohon - Liner Notes
 Bobby Miller - Composer 
 Bobby Lee Miller - Album Supervision 
 Jayme Pieruzzi - Reissue Mastering  
 Valerie Simpson - Composer 
 Charles Stephens - Arranger 
 T-Bone Walker - Composer

References

External links
 [] at Allmusic

1969 albums
Cadet Records albums
Marlena Shaw albums
Albums produced by Charles Stepney